is a passenger railway station located in the city of Tama, Tokyo, Japan, operated by the private railway operator Keiō Corporation.

Lines and services
Seiseki-sakuragaoka Station is on the Keiō Line, and is located 26.3 kilometers from the starting point of the line at Shinjuku Station. All Keiō Line services stop at the station. Along with Tama Center Station, it is one of the main gateways to the Tama New Town development.

Station layout
The station has two elevated opposed side platforms.

Platforms

History
It was renamed Seiseki-sakuragaoka Station on 1 May 1937.

Passenger statistics
In fiscal 2019, the station was used by an average of 65,246 passengers daily.

Surrounding area
There are several commercial complexes, including a Keio Department Store, built around the station, as well as Keio's head office. There is a bus terminal to the north of the station.

In popular culture 
The station is frequented in Studio Ghibli's 1995 film Whisper of the Heart, though it was portrayed as more developed than it was during the film.

There is a dedicated map following the film in addition to a miniature replica antique store postbox where passerby's can insert their dreams and goals.

See also
List of railway stations in Japan

References

External links

 Seiseki-sakuragaoka Station information (Keio) 

Keio Line
Stations of Keio Corporation
Railway stations in Tokyo
Tama, Tokyo
Railway stations in Japan opened in 1925